The 2022 BYU Cougars men's volleyball team represents Brigham Young University in the 2022 NCAA Division I & II men's volleyball season. The Cougars, led by seventh year head coach Shawn Olmstead, play their home games at Smith Fieldhouse. The Cougars are members of the MPSF and were picked to finish third in the MPSF preseason poll. After finishing last season ranked #2 the Cougars enter the 2022 season with the #6 ranking.

Roster

Schedule
TV/Internet Streaming information:
All home games will be televised on BYUtv or BYUtv.org. Most road games will also be streamed by the schools streaming service. The conference tournament will be streamed by FloVolleyball.

 *-Indicates conference match.
 Times listed are Mountain Time Zone.

Announcers for televised games

Penn State: No commentary
Penn State: Jake Starr & Jordan Mansberger 
UC Irvine: Jarom Jordan, Steve Vail & Kiki Solano
UC Irvine: Jarom Jordan, Steve Vail, & Kiki Solano
Mount Olive: Spencer Linton, Steve Vail, & Kiki Solano
Mount Olive: Spencer Linton, Steve Vail, & Kiki Solano
Ball State: Jarom Jordan, Steve Vail, & Kiki Solano
Ball State: Jarom Jordan, Steve Vail, & Kiki Solano
UC San Diego: Jarom Jordan, Steve Vail, & Kiki Solano
UC San Diego: Jarom Jordan, Steve Vail, & Kiki Solano
UC Santa Barbara: Max Kelton & Katie Spieler
Grand Canyon: Jarom Jordan, Steve Vail, & Kiki Solano
Grand Canyon: Jarom Jordan, Steve Vail, & Kiki Solano
USC: Mark Beltran & Paul Duchesne
USC: Anne Marie Anderson
Concordia Irvine: Jarom Jordan, Steve Vail, & Kiki Solano
Concordia Irvine: Jarom Jordan, Steve Vail, & Kiki Solano
Pepperdine: Al Epstein
Pepperdine: Al Epstein
Stanford: Ted Enberg
Stanford: Ted Enberg
UCLA: Jarom Jordan, Steve Vail, & Kiki Solano
UCLA: Jarom Jordan, Steve Vail, & Kiki Solano
MPSF Quarterfinal- Pepperdine: Nick Kopp

Rankings 

^The Media did not release a Pre-season poll.

References

2022 in sports in Utah
2022 NCAA Division I & II men's volleyball season
2022 team
2022 Mountain Pacific Sports Federation volleyball season